Dalreoch railway station serves the west end of Dumbarton in West Dunbartonshire, Scotland. The station is managed and served by ScotRail and is served by trains on the North Clyde Line.

History

The Caledonian and  Junction Railway (C&DJR) was opened in 1850, and Dalreoch railway station opened on 15 July 1850. The station became a junction with the opening of the Glasgow, Dumbarton and Helensburgh Railway (GD&HR) on 28 May 1858. The tunnel at the west end of the station, on the route to Helensburgh, was doubled in 1896 at a cost of £400,000 - the last section of the line to be doubled.

The line was electrified in 1960. Services on the Lanarkshire & Dumbartonshire Railway route to  via  ended in October 1964 when it fell victim to the Beeching Axe.

Facilities
The station is equipped with a ticket office on platform 2, the latter adjacent to the car park and bike racks. Both platforms have benches, help points and shelters. The platforms are linked by a footbridge, so only platform 2 has step-free access.

Passenger volume 

The statistics cover twelve month periods that start in April.

Services
On weekdays & Saturdays, there is a typically half-hourly service westbound to Helensburgh Central and Balloch each, and half-hourly eastbound to either Edinburgh Waverley (via Glasgow Queen Street low-level, non-stop between Dalmuir and Hyndland) or Airdrie (calling at all stations via Singer). On Sundays, the service remains half-hourly, but two trains per hour serve all stations via , while the other two serve all stations via Yoker, the latter heading to either Larkhall via Hamilton Central, or Motherwell via Whifflet (i.e., hourly trains on both routes).

References

Bibliography

External links 

 Video footage of the station on YouTube

Railway stations in West Dunbartonshire
Former Dumbarton and Balloch Railway stations
Railway stations in Great Britain opened in 1850
SPT railway stations
Dumbarton
Railway stations served by ScotRail